William Conway Smith (13 July 1926 – 1989) was an English footballer born in Huddersfield, Yorkshire, who played as an inside forward for Huddersfield Town, Queens Park Rangers and Halifax Town in the Football League, and in non-league football for Nelson.

Smith, the son of Huddersfield Town and England footballer Billy Smith, signed for Huddersfield on professional forms in 1945, and made his debut in the 1947–48 season. His progress was interrupted by a broken leg sustained in January 1949, and in March 1951, after "a lengthy spell" on the transfer list, he joined Queens Park Rangers. He played 174 league games for QPR, scoring 81 goals, before transferring to Halifax Town in 1956, where he achieved a similar record.

References

External links
 

1926 births
1989 deaths
Footballers from Huddersfield
English footballers
Association football forwards
Queens Park Rangers F.C. players
Huddersfield Town A.F.C. players
Halifax Town A.F.C. players
Nelson F.C. players
English Football League players